Distinction is a principle under international humanitarian law governing the legal use of force in an armed conflict, whereby belligerents must distinguish between combatants and noncombatants (civilians). Combatant in this instance means persons entitled to directly participate in hostilities and thus are not afforded immunity from being directly targeted in situations of armed conflict. Civilian in this instance means civilians who are non-combatants. The definition of "civilian" under international humanitarian law is by no means settled, as further clarity and explanation is needed in regards to determining precisely when, how and for how long a civilian loses his or her protection from targeting.
 
Article 51.3 of Protocol I to the Geneva Conventions explains that "Civilians shall enjoy the protection afforded by this section, unless and for such time as they take a direct part in hostilities".</ref> Distinction and proportionality are important factors in assessing military necessity in that the harm caused to civilians or civilian property must be proportional and not "excessive in relation to the concrete and direct military advantage anticipated" by an attack on a military objective.

Codification
Distinction is covered by Protocol I (Additional to the Geneva Conventions), Chapter II: "Civilians and Civilian Population". Article 48 set forth the principle of distinction by establishing that "[T]he Parties to the conflict shall at all times distinguish between the civilian population and combatants." Article 50 defines who is a civilian and what is a civilian population; article 51 describes the protection which should be given to civilian populations; and chapter III regulates the targeting of civilian objects. Article 8(2)(b)(i) of the Rome Statute of the International Criminal Court also prohibits attack directed against civilians. Not all states have ratified Protocol I or the Rome Statute, but it is an accepted principle of international humanitarian law that the direct targeting of civilians is a breach of the customary laws of war and is binding on all belligerents.

Luis Moreno-Ocampo was the Chief Prosecutor at the International Criminal Court who investigated allegations of war crimes during the 2003 invasion of Iraq. He published an open letter containing his findings; in a section titled "Allegations concerning War Crimes", he elucidates this use of distinction:

See also
 Indiscriminate attack
 International Court of Justice advisory opinion on the Legality of the Threat or Use of Nuclear Weapons
 Civilian casualty ratio

Footnotes

References

. See section "Allegations concerning War Crimes" Pages 4,5

Further reading

International humanitarian law